State Route 46 (SR-46) is a state highway at the eastern edge of Utah running for  in San Juan County.

Route description
The route begins in the west at its junction with US-191 at La Sal Junction about twenty miles (32 km) south of Moab and proceeds eastward to the south of the La Sal Mountains through the town of La Sal before ending at the Colorado state line where the road becomes SH 90, which then leads to a junction with SH 141 at Vancorum.

History
The road from SR-9 (US-450, now US-191) at La Sal Junction east to Colorado was added to the state highway system in 1915, and in 1927 the state legislature numbered it SR-46.

Major intersections

References

046
 046